The women's 3000 metres steeplechase event at the 2009 Asian Athletics Championships was held at the Guangdong Olympic Stadium on November 12.

Results

References
Results

3000
Steeplechase at the Asian Athletics Championships
2009 in women's athletics